Ralph Howard Cosham (25 February 1936 – 30 September 2014), was a British-born American film, stage and voice actor and book narrator. Cosham also recorded under the name Geoffrey Howard. He lived in Reston, Virginia. He was a member of the acting companies of the Washington Theatre Club, the Folger Shakespeare Library, Arena Stage and the Shakespeare Theater all in Washington, DC. Cosham changed careers from British journalist to actor in the 1970s. Several of his works were awarded "Audio Best of the Year" by Publishers Weekly.

Ralph Cosham died of an illness on Tuesday, 30 September 2014 at his home in Reston, Virginia, at the age of 78.

Career
In early 1964, Hamilton Company LTD contracted with United Press International to prepare a special souvenir magazine of The Beatles' first visit to America. UPI assigned English immigrant Cosham to write this. His interviews with concertgoers and reports were published as "The Beatles at Carnegie Hall," which remains easy to find today.

In voice acting he was featured in the video game The Elder Scrolls IV: Oblivion as the Breton males, including characters such as Jauffre, the Grandmaster of the Blades, and Vicente Valtieri; Dr. Guervich in Death Without Consent (2005); he played the voice part "townspeople 3" in Pirates of the Caribbean (2003).

In acting he was a driver in Shadow Conspiracy (1997); Supreme Court Justice Jensen in The Pelican Brief (1993), Judge Assel Steward in Suspect (1987); a Marine Lieutenant in Starman (1984); and played the part of Braddock's Captain in the mini TV series George Washington (1984).

As a book narrator, Cosham (or as Howard) narrated over 100 books since 1992. Some titles include The Time Machine by H. G. Wells, The Castle by Franz Kafka, The Secret Agent (1996), Heart of Darkness (2002), Frankenstein (2002), Around the World in Eighty Days (2003), Alice in Wonderland (2004), Watership Down (2010), Dead Man's Chest (2001 novel by Roger Johnson, narrated in 2006), King Leopold's Ghost, Postwar: A History of Europe Since 1945, numerous works of C.S. Lewis including The Space Trilogy, Miracles, Mere Christianity, The Problem of Pain and The Screwtape Letters, as well as a collection of American short stories titled The American Experience: A Collection of Great American Stories (2004). Cosham was the only narrator for a series of mysteries written by Louise Penny; he won AudioFile Earphones and Library Journal awards for best audiobook and the Mystery Audie Award in 2013 for The Beautiful Mystery. Cosham recorded the first ten books of the series.

Filmography

References

External links
 Personal tributes to actor Ralph Cosham, Christopher Henley, October 16, 2014
 A Tribute to Ralph Cosham, Catherine Flye, October 14, 2014

1936 births
2014 deaths
American male actors
Audiobook narrators